Yanda is an extinct and nearly unattested Australian Aboriginal language of Queensland. It was apparently close to Guwa.

References

Maric languages
Extinct languages of Queensland